Khalkhgol (meaning Khalkha river) is a sum (district) of Dornod Province in eastern Mongolia. There are 3,203 people in the sum, including 1,756 in the sum center. The area of the sum is 28,093 km², with a population density of 0.11 people/km². The largest district in Mongolia by land area.

Climate
Khalkhgol has a continental climate (Köppen climate classification Dwb) with warm summers and severely cold winters. Most precipitation falls in the summer as rain, with some snow in autumn and spring. Winters are quite dry, with occasional light snow.

Maps

References

Districts of Dornod Province